ŽNK Agram is a Croatian women's association football club based in Zagreb. The club was founded in 2000 and it currently competes in the Croatian First Division.

Honours
Croatian First Division:
Runners-up (1):  2017
Croatian Cup:
Runners-up (1): 2018

Recent seasons

Women's football clubs in Croatia
Association football clubs established in 2000
Football clubs in Zagreb
2000 establishments in Croatia